Ogcodes schembrii is a species of fly in the family Acroceridae (small-headed flies). They are diurnal and endemic to Malta.

References

Source 

Endemic fauna of Malta
Acroceridae
Diptera of Europe